Super Vocal (Chinese: 声入人心男团), is a Chinese mainland bel canto quartet with a line-up consisting of Ju Hongchuan, Cai Chengyu, Gao Tianhe and Tong Zhuo. 

The music label Decca announced the official formation of the first Chinese male bel canto group named "Super Vocal” at the Decca 90 Anniversary Event. The celebration took place December 4, 2019 at the Beijing National Centre for the Performing Arts.

Members

Group formation 
The first season of the Hunan Satellite TV show Super-Vocal premiered on November 2, 2018 with the season finale airing January 18, 2019. A total of 36 singers from 25 universities participated. 

At the beginning of 2019, singers Tongzhuo, Gao Tianhe, Ju Hongchuan, Cai Chengyu, Zhang Chao and Dai Wei signed with Hunan Satellite TV. 

Gao Tianhe joined "Day Day Up" as an intern host. Gao passed the internship assessment with perfect scores, successfully becoming a member of the "Day Day Brothers". 

Tong Zhuo was a guest host and participant in the TV game show “Happy Camp”. He also participated in the TV shows "Magic Chinese Characters", "Chinese Restaurant Season Three". 

Ju Hongchuan and Cai Chengyu attended multiple Hunan Satellite TV events. They also released their own singles. 

On January 26, 2019, Hunan Satellite TV's "Singer 2019" production team announced on their official Weibo that a "Super Vocal" group would be participating in the second kick-out round. The “Super Vocal” group would compete against singer Qian Zhenghao for official qualifications. 

All four members of the group Super Vocal appeared on the Hunan Satellite TV show Super-Vocal. Among them Cai Chengyu, Gao Tianhe and Tong Zhuo were the finalists on the show.

Career 
On November 8, 2019, Super Vocal released their first single, Mandarin version of the song "Into the Unknown" (Chinese: 未知的真相), title track of the Disney animation Frozen II. On November 12, Super Vocal performed the song live during the Frozen II Chinese premiere, taking place at the Shanghai Walt Disney Theatre. 

In March 2020, Super Vocal participated in Hunan Satellite TV's "Singer 2020" during the fourth round of surprise knockout challenges. They performed their new original single "Ni De Se Cai"  (Chinese: 你的色彩, English: Your Colors, Italian: Qui Con Me)  and won the challenge against Xiao Jingteng, obtaining the official qualification for replacement. 

The studio version of “Your Colors” was released on March 27, 2020. “Your Colors” is the leading single for the group’s debut album which is set to release in the year 2020. The song was composed by two-time Emmy nominee Roxanne Seeman, Ivo Moring, George Komsky, Italian lyrics was written by Saverio Principini , and Chinese lyrics written by Cheng He. The song was produced by Nick Patrick and Wu Qinglong.

In the breakout round broadcast on April 17, Super Vocal performed Lin Zhixuan's "Never Left" and lost to Yuan Yawei.

References 

Pop opera groups
Opera crossover singers
Vocal quartets
21st-century Chinese male singers
Universal Music Group artists